Frank J. Kelly,  is a British professor of community health and policy and Head of the Environmental Research Group (a global centre dedicated to air pollution research) at Imperial College London. He is an authority on the medical effects of air pollution.

Academic career and research 

Kelly obtained his first degree from Queen's University Belfast, before taking a Ph.D. in physiology at Pennsylvania State University, where he was also a postdoctoral fellow. After working in the United States, he returned to the UK as a lecturer at Southampton University. During the early part of his career, his research focused on free-radical biology and human disease, and lung damage in premature babies and cystic fibrosis patients.

In 1992, Kelly moved to London and developed a new research interest in the effect of air pollution on lungs and respiratory health. He became a Senior Lecturer at St Thomas’ Hospital, where his research interests included the health effects of vitamin E, before moving to King's College, London, where he was Professor of Environmental Health and Director of the Environmental Research Group. Kelly and his group transferred to Imperial College in 2020.

Kelly works with the World Health Organization on air pollution issues and is a member of the Health Effects Institute (HEI) Review Committee. He has also served as Chairman of the UK Department of Health Expert Committee on the Medical Effects of Air Pollutants (COMEAP), President of the European Society for Free Radical Research, and Chairman of the British Association for Lung Research.  

Kelly has published over 380 peer-reviewed papers.

Awards 

Kelly won the 2019 Royal Society of Chemistry Toxicology Award for "outstanding research into free radical and antioxidant toxicological mechanisms relevant to pulmonary toxicity". Also that year, he shared the Elsevier Haagen-Smit Prize with Julia Fussell for a paper on the toxicity of particulate air pollution. He was elected a Fellow of the Academy of Medical Sciences in 2018 and became an honorary fellow of the Institute of Air Quality Management in 2021.

Media appearances 

Kelly is a frequent media commentator on air quality issues, such as pollution in London, pollution caused by road transport, whether a shift to electric cars can tackle air quality, the use of taxes to improve air quality, indoor air pollution, air quality in other parts of the world, and the effectiveness of air pollution limits and guidelines.

Selected publications

Books and reports

Scientific papers

References

External links
 

Year of birth missing (living people)
Living people
Academics of Imperial College London
Academics of King's College London
Environmental health practitioners
British medical researchers
British physiologists
Alumni of Queen's University Belfast
Pennsylvania State University alumni
Fellows of the Academy of Medical Sciences (United Kingdom)
Air pollution in the United Kingdom